Monthureux-le-Sec is a commune in the Vosges department in Grand Est in northeastern France.

Inhabitants are called Monthécursiens.

Geography
The commune contains the meeting point of the three drainage basins of the rivers Rhône, Rhine and Meuse.

Personalities
Célestin Gérard, (1821 - 1885) manufacturer of agricultural machinery and inventor of a mobile Threshing machine and of other steam powered implements, was born at Monthureux-le-Sec.

See also
Communes of the Vosges department

References

Communes of Vosges (department)